Ramlal Jat (born 2 May 1965) is the Revenue minister in the Govt. of Rajasthan. He has been elected as the  MLA for Mandal constituency and is serving as the Chairman of Co-operative Milk Union (Saras Dairy) Bhilwara.  He was the Indian National Congress MLA from Mandal Assembly Constituency (Bhilwara district) in the Rajasthan Legislative Assembly (13th house). He contested the 2013 Rajasthan Legislative Assembly elections (14th house) from Asind Bhilwara.

Personal life
Ramlal Jat was born on 2 May 1965 at village Pratapura in Bhilwara district, Rajasthan (India) in the family of Jamna Lal Jat. He is married to Sambhu Devi and has two sons and a daughter. He is a Hindu.

Membership of legislature

Positions held

References

1965 births
Indian National Congress politicians from Rajasthan
Living people
People from Bhilwara district
Rajasthan MLAs 2018–2023